Tibbetts Brook may refer to the following waterways:
 Tibbetts Brook (Minnesota)
 Tibbetts Brook (New York)
 Tibbetts Brook Park